Nandhini is a 1997 Indian Tamil-language film directed by Manobala. The film stars  Prakash Raj, Suhasini,  Keerthi Reddy, Vineeth, S.P.Balasubrahmanyam, Manivannan and Vadivukkarasi. The film's score and soundtrack are composed by Sirpy, with lyrics by Pazhani Bharathi.

Plot
The movie 'Nandhini' traces the metamorphosis of a young college going girl, Raji. Raji is in love with Suresh but strange stories of her mother Nandhini being linked with Rangaswamy, their paying guest, deeply affect her. Raji questions Rangaswamy but he is deeply anguished by her behaviour and suffers a heart attack that ultimately ends the Good Samaritan's life. Raji is emotionally disturbed and refuses any association with Suresh, and seeks solace with Nandhini. However Nandhini's strange behaviour devastates her and she wishes to resume her relationship with Suresh.  Finally, Suresh learns about Prakash and Nandhini's love and reunites with Raji in the end, and escorts her from Chennai to Mumbai. Kannadi Vijay then promises to care for Nandhini.

Cast 
 Prakash Raj as Prakash 
 Suhasini as Nandhini
 Keerthi Reddy as Raji 
 Vineeth as Suresh 
 S.P.Balasubrahmanyam as Rangaswamy 
 Manivannan 
 Vadivukkarasi 
 Thalaivasal Vijay as Kannadi Vijay
 Madhan Bob
 Thadi Balaji
 Manobala

Tracklist
The soundtrack was composed by Sirpy. Initially A. R. Rahman was approached for the film music. Due to the busy schedule of A.R. Rahman, it was finally changed.

Home media
Nandhini was released in DVD by Pyramid Video.

References

1997 films
1990s Tamil-language films
Indian drama films
Films directed by Manobala